The Daily Life of the Immortal King (Chinese: 仙王的日常生活, pinyin: Xiān Wáng de Rìcháng Shēnghuó) is a Chinese novel by Kuxuan. This novel is published by Qidian in Chinese and Webnovel in English. It began daily serialization in 2017. As of 22 June 2022, the novel has 2189 chapters, 1176 chapters of which have been translated into English.

A 15 episode donghua series based on the novel of the same name was first released on Bilibili on 18 January 2020. The third season for the series was announced and began on 29 September 2022 and ended on December 18 2022.

Characters
 Sun Lulu as Wang Ling
 Qian Chen as Yi Sun Shin

Media

Donghua
The donghua was released on Bilibili on 18 January 2020. It is adapted from a novel that was first released on webnovel, with the same name and it had over a thousand chapters. Netflix is also streaming the first season beginning 30 June 2021. The Donghua was renewed for a second season set to premiere in the spring of 2021. An announcement with a trailer was published on the Bilibili website and YouTube. It began on 30 October 2021 and streamed on Funimation till 8 January 2022.
On 20 July 2022, Crunchyroll announced an English dub of the first season. The first episode of the third season was released on 29 September 2022 with the second on 1 October.

Season 1
As a cultivation genius who has achieved a new realm every two years since he was a year old, Wang Ling is a near-invincible existence with prowess far beyond his control. But now that he’s sixteen, he faces his greatest battle yet – Senior High School. With one challenge after another popping up, his plans for a low-key high school life seem further and further away…
Episode 1:A boy with extraordinary magical powers tries to pass for average at his new high school, where the students learn to cultivate their spiritual force.

Season 2 
When the shadow assassin had been dealt with and Ling Wang's plan to live a normal life might work, a new global threat appears and he is the only one able to save the world.

Season 3
After the second demon invasion has been dealt with. A new family appears-Kyuumiya family, an exorcist group. This season revolves around the exorcist family's attempt to obtain demons and use them to control the world.

References

External links
The Daily Life of the Immortal King at bilibili

2020 Chinese television series debuts
Animated series based on novels
Chinese animated television series
Chinese novels
Chinese web series
Crunchyroll anime
Haoliners Animation League
Mandarin-language television shows
Xianxia television series